Nikolai Ivanovich Kareev (6 December 1850 – 18 February 1931) was a Russian historian and philosopher.  He was educated at Moscow and earned his doctorate in history in 1884.

Life

Like many other intellectuals in Russia, Kareev was deeply influenced by the liberal, progressive, constitutional, and Socialist movements developing in Russia in the late nineteenth century.  Peter Kropotkin, the Russian Anarchist, describes him as one of the few who correctly understood the French Revolution, because he had studied "movements preceding the revolution of July 14".

Works

 Философия культурной и социальной истории нового времени (Filosofiia kulturnoi i sotsialnoi istorii novago vremeni, 1893)
 История Западной Европы в начале XX века (Istorii͡a Zapadnoi Evropy v nat͡schalie XX vieka / Moskva : izd.otdel Moskovskago nauchnago ins-ta, 1920)
 Историология (Istoriologiia, 1915)

References 

1850 births
1931 deaths
Writers from Moscow
People from Moskovsky Uyezd
Russian nobility
Russian Constitutional Democratic Party members
Members of the 1st State Duma of the Russian Empire
19th-century historians from the Russian Empire
20th-century Russian historians
Imperial Moscow University alumni